Baryplegma is a genus of tephritid  or fruit flies in the family Tephritidae.

Species
Baryplegma apiatum (Wulp, 1899)
Baryplegma breviradiatum (Hendel, 1914)
Baryplegma coeleste (Hendel, 1914)
Baryplegma forsteri (Hering, 1961)
Baryplegma gilvum Wulp, 1899
Baryplegma pertusum (Bates, 1934)
Baryplegma pseudovespillo (Hendel, 1914)
Baryplegma ricavelatum (Hendel, 1914)
Baryplegma rusticum (Bates, 1934)
Baryplegma vespillo (Schiner, 1868)
Baryplegma vulpianum Enderlein, 1911

References

Dacinae
Tephritidae genera
Diptera of North America
Diptera of South America
Taxa named by Frederik Maurits van der Wulp